Kancharapalem is a locality in the city of Visakhapatnam, India. Kancharapalem is an old settlement of Visakhapatanam. It has the oldest railway locomotive shed, the first Industrial estate of Visakhapatnam, Govt. Industrial training Institute. Government polytechnic college (started in 1956) railway quarters, port and Navy quarters are located in this area. The oldest bridge in the town is located here known as Gnanapuram Bridge.

It is divided into many parts with community-specific localities like Gavara Kancharapalem, Golla Kancharapalem, Reddy Kancharapalem.

Transport
APSRTC Buses access in every part of the city.

Popular culture 
The 2018 Telugu-language anthology film C/o Kancharapalem, is set and shot extensively in this locality.

References

Neighbourhoods in Visakhapatnam